The 2006 FIFA World Cup CONCACAF–AFC qualification play-off was a home-and-away play-off between the following teams:

The fourth-place team in the CONCACAF qualifying tournament, Trinidad and Tobago.
The fifth-place team of the AFC qualifying tournament, Bahrain.

The draw for determining the order of the home and away legs was made at a FIFA congress on 10 September 2005.

Trinidad and Tobago was awarded a place in 2006 FIFA World Cup after winning the playoff 2–1 on aggregate.

Play-off match

First leg

Second leg

References 

5
Bahrain national football team matches
Trinidad and Tobago national football team matches
qual
5
Qual
FIFA World Cup qualification inter-confederation play-offs
2005–06 in Bahraini football
Qual
World
International association football competitions hosted by Bahrain
International association football competitions hosted by Trinidad and Tobago
November 2005 sports events in North America
November 2005 sports events in Asia